A Street Called Straight is an album by Roy Buchanan, released in 1976 on Atlantic Records. The album contains the instrumental, "My Friend, Jeff", in honour of British guitarist Jeff Beck. One year earlier Beck released Blow by Blow, featuring "Cause We've Ended As Lovers", which was dedicated to Roy Buchanan.

The album title comes from Acts 9:11.

Critical reception
AllMusic wrote that "the reading of Jimi Hendrix' 'If Six Was Nine' is an almost natural extension of the original, with a brooding and slinky rhythm."

Track listing
All tracks by Roy Buchanan except where noted.

 "Running Out" (Buchanan, John Harrison) – 2:51 
 "Keep What You Got" (Buchanan, Joe Mardin) – 3:17
 "Man On The Floor" – 3:26
 "Good God Have Mercy" (Billy Roberts) – 4:09
 "Okay" – 2:37
 "Caruso" – 3:24
 "My Friend Jeff" – 4:03
 "If Six Was Nine" (Jimi Hendrix) – 4:04
 "Guitar Cadenza" – 3:47
 "The Messiah Will Come Again" – 4:11
 "I Still Think About Ida Mae" – 3:44

Personnel 
Roy Buchanan – guitar, vocals
Rubens Bassini – percussion
Kenneth Bichel – synthesizer
Michael Brecker – horn
Randy Brecker – horn
David Brigati – backing vocals
Eddie Brigati – vocals, backing vocals
Robin Clark – vocals, backing vocals
Billy Cobham – percussion, timbales, tom-tom
Lew Del Gatto – horn
Ronnie "Byrd" Foster – drums, vocals, backing vocals
John Harrison – bass, vocals, backing vocals
Will Lee – bass
Buddy Lucas – harmonica
Malcolm Lukens – keyboards
Andy Newmark – drums
George Opalisky – horn
Barry Rogers – horn
Gonzalo Sifre – percussion, drums
Diane Sumler – backing vocals
Luther Vandross – vocals

References

1976 albums
Roy Buchanan albums
Albums produced by Arif Mardin
Atlantic Records albums